Calotrichopsis is a genus of fungi within the family Lichinaceae. The genus contains three species.

References

Lichinomycetes
Lichen genera
Taxa named by Edvard August Vainio